Loopflesh/Fleshloop is a split EP between English industrial metal band Godflesh and English rock band Loop. On side A of the 7-inch vinyl, Loop covers the song "Like Rats" by Godflesh, and on side B, Godflesh covers the song "Straight to Your Heart" by Loop. The palindrome "Rats Live On No Evil Star" appears etched into both sides of the record. Only a thousand copies were pressed.

Background

Both Justin Broadrick of Godflesh and Robert Hampson of Loop were fans of each other's bands before they met. After becoming introduced, Loop invited Godflesh to be opening act on their 1990 tour. It was after that successful string of shows that the bands decided to create Loopflesh/Fleshloop.

Hampson and his bandmates were originally fans of Head of David, in which Broadrick drummed. As such, they were immediately aware of Godflesh and its first album, Streetcleaner. Regarding the album and the song from it that Loop covered, Robert Hampson said:

Regarding the song that Godflesh chose to cover, Broadrick said:

After Loop's dissolution in 1991, Hampson became a regular contributor to Godflesh, appearing on Cold World and half of the songs on the band's second album, Pure. In 2014, the two bands reunited and conducted a brief tour together.

Track listing

Personnel
Credits adapted from liner notes.

Godflesh
Justin Broadrick – guitar, vocals, production
G. C. Green – bass
Loop
Robert Hampson – guitar, vocals
Hugo Morgan – bass
Dan Boyd – guitar
Wayne Maskel – drums

References

1991 albums
Godflesh EPs
Split EPs
Loop (band) albums